David Pagbe (born October 18, 1980 in Yaoundé, Cameroon) is a Cameroonian former footballer who played as a center back for Persela Lamongan.

Career
On November 3, 2014, he was released by Semen Padang. In  January 2015, he was signed by Persela Lamongan. On December 20, 2015, he joined Persib Bandung

Honours 
Semen Padang
Winner
 Indonesia Premier League: 2011-12
 Indonesian Community Shield: 2013

References

External links 
 

1978 births
Living people
Cameroonian footballers
Cameroonian expatriate footballers
Expatriate footballers in Malaysia
Penang F.C. players
Expatriate footballers in Indonesia
Liga 1 (Indonesia) players
Persikabo Bogor players
Semen Padang F.C. players
Persela Lamongan players
Footballers from Yaoundé
Cameroonian expatriate sportspeople in Malaysia
Cameroonian expatriate sportspeople in Indonesia
Association football defenders